Groot Constantia is the oldest wine estate in South Africa and provincial heritage site in the suburb of Constantia in Cape Town, South Africa.

"Groot" in Dutch and Afrikaans translates as "great" (as in large) in English.

History
In 1685, during an annual visit to the Cape, Hendrik Adriaan van Rheede tot Drakenstein granted the grounds of Groot Constantia to Simon van der Stel the VOC Governor of the Cape of Good Hope.

Van der Stel built the house and used the land to produce wine as well as other fruit and vegetables, and for cattle farming. Following Van der Stel's death in 1712 the estate was broken up and sold in three parts: Groot Constantia; Klein Constantia; and Bergvliet.

In 1779 the portion of the estate including Van der Stel's Cape Dutch-style manor house was sold to the Cloete family, who planted extensive vineyards and extended and improved the mansion by commissioning the architect Louis Michel Thibault. The wine cellar was added by Cloete in 1791. The house remained in the possession of the Cloete family until 1885, during which period the estate became famous for its production of Constantia dessert wine.

In 1885 Groot Constantia was purchased by the government of the Cape of Good Hope and was used as an experimental wine and agricultural estate. Following a disastrous fire in 1925 the house was extensively restored.

In the year 1925 the manor house completely burnt down. Funds were raised to reconstruct it to its original Cape Dutch splendour.

In 1969 the manor house became part of the South African Cultural History Museum, and in 1993 the estate passed into the ownership of the Groot Constantia Trust. The exhibition in the house is managed by Iziko South African Museum, and is particularly focused on rural slavery and the life of slaves during the early Cape colonial period.

Today, other estates have joined Groot Constantia to form the scenic Constantia wine route. These estates include Klein Constantia, Buitenverwachting, Constantia Uitsig, Steenberg, Constantia Glen, Eagles Nest and High Constantia.

Wine production
Groot Constantia is noted particularly for its production of high-quality red wines, including Shiraz, Merlot and blended red Gouverneurs Reserve. In 2003 the estate began production of a Constantia dessert wine, called Grand Constance, for the first time since the 1880s.

Popular culture 
 A number of scenes for the 1955 movie Untamed was set at and within Groot Constantia after the protagonist discovers a diamond and returns to Cape Town to live in a stately mansion.

Gallery

See also
 List of Castles and Fortifications in South Africa

References

External links

Groot Constantia on Iziko Museums of South Africa

1684 establishments in the Dutch Empire
Dutch colonial architecture
Wineries of South Africa
South African wine
Tourist attractions in South Africa
Buildings and structures in the Western Cape
Museums in Cape Town
Food and drink companies based in Cape Town